Allred is an English surname.  Notable people with this name include:

 Beau Allred (born 1965), American baseball player
 Cary D. Allred, American politician
 Colin Allred (born 1983), American football player and politician
 Corbin Allred (born 1979), American actor
 Gloria Allred (born 1941), American lawyer and radio talk host
 James V. Allred (1889–1959), American politician
 John Allred (born 1974), American football player
 John Allred (born 1962), American jazz trombonist
 Julie Allred, American child actress
 Karl Allred, Wyoming politician
 Keith J. Allred, American naval lawyer
 Ken Allred (born 1940), Canadian politician
 Lance Allred (born 1981), American basketball player
 Laura Allred, American comic book artist
 Loren Allred (1989) American singer, songwriter and actress.
 Mike Allred, American comic book artist and writer
 Owen A. Allred (1914–2005), American Mormon fundamentalist leader
 Rulon C. Allred (1906–1977), American Mormon fundamentalist leader

See also 
 Allred, Nevada
 Allred, Tennessee
 Allred, Texas
 Allred Unit, prison in Wichita County, Texas, United States

References 

English-language surnames